John Stevens Mason (August 18, 1839 – April 3, 1918) was an American politician who represented Loudoun and Fauquier counties in the Virginia House of Delegates from 1889 to 1893. Through his father, Richard Chichester Mason, he was a direct descendant of George Mason.

References

External links 

1839 births
1918 deaths
Democratic Party members of the Virginia House of Delegates
19th-century American politicians